Montfa may refer to the following places in France:

 Montfa, Ariège, a commune in the Ariège department
 Montfa, Tarn, a commune in the Tarn department

oc:Montfan